Skoghall (literally means "Forest Hall") is a locality and the seat of Hammarö Municipality in Värmland County, Sweden with 13,265 inhabitants in 2010. Stora Enso with paper mill and manufacturing being the largest employer. Second largest is Akzo Nobel Base Chemicals AB. Skoghall is located on the island of Hammarö and is also considered a suburb of Karlstad, situated only seven km from the center of Karlstad.

References 

Municipal seats of Värmland County
Swedish municipal seats
Populated places in Värmland County
Populated places in Hammarö Municipality